Pszczółki  is a village in Gdańsk County, Pomeranian Voivodeship, in northern Poland. It is the seat of the gmina (administrative district) called Gmina Pszczółki. It is located within the historic region of Pomerania.

The village has a population of 4,053.

History

The oldest known mention of the village comes from 1307 under the name Psolcicz. Pszczółki was a royal village of the Polish Crown, administratively located in the Tczew County in the Pomeranian Voivodeship.

References

Villages in Gdańsk County